Niagara: Miracles, Myths and Magic is a 1986 IMAX film directed and produced by Kieth Merrill. The film, currently shown hourly at Niagara Falls State Park's Adventure Theater on the American side of the border and multiple times daily (for a fee) at the IMAX Theatre located on the Canadian side of the border (although the theatre is currently closed pending a move to a yet-unknown location), shows the history of the Niagara Falls, dating back to the earliest legends.

The film also shows the creation and history of the Maid of the Mist boats.

Part of the film's focus is people who braved the falls, such as a tight-rope walker, a barrel rider, and those unfortunate enough to accidentally plunge over the Falls. Actors portraying Annie Edson Taylor, Roger Woodward and Charles Blondin (played by Philippe Petit) appear in the film.

References

External links
Niagara Adventure Theater info (USA)
Niagara IMAX Theater info (Canada)
Niagara Falls State Park Visitor Center info

Films directed by Kieth Merrill
Niagara Falls State Park
IMAX short films
1986 films
Films scored by Bill Conti